Chrysodema swierstrae is a species of Jewel Beetle of the Buprestidae family.

Description
These beetles have a glossy surface with metallic green color.

Distribution
Chrysodema swierstrae can be found in a large part of South Eastern Asia, from Malaysia and Indonesia up to Philippines.

References

  Biolib
 Buprestidae of South East Asia

swierstrae
Buprestidae
Beetles described in 1883